Henriette Nanette "Jetty" Paerl (27 May 1921 – 22 August 2013) was a Dutch singer and resistance member of Jewish origin. She is known for being one of the Netherlands' representatives in the Eurovision Song Contest 1956 with the song "De vogels van Holland", and for being the first singer ever to perform in the Eurovision Song Contest.

Biography

Early life 
Paerl was born and raised in Amsterdam. After the German invasion of the Netherlands in May 1940, she fled to London with her parents and swimmer Willy den Ouden, where she worked as a children's clothing designer at a shop in New Bond Street. She also contributed to the broadcasts of Radio Oranje, a radio programme created by the Dutch government-in-exile, due to which she became known as Jetje van Radio Oranje ("Jetty of Radio Orange") in the Netherlands. In the programme, she performed songs – written by her father Jo Paerl and composed by Louis Davids and Dirk Witte – in which the Nazis and members of the National Socialist Movement (NSB) were openly made fun of.

Towards the end of the war, Paerl became a member of the Women's Auxiliary Corps (Vrouwen Hulpkorps) of the Royal Netherlands Army. After the liberation of the Netherlands in May 1945, she returned to her home country via Zeeland and was stationed in Rotterdam. Shortly after, she learned that both her elder brothers were still alive. One had fled to Switzerland, while the other had stayed in the Netherlands during the war.

After the war 

In 1951, Paerl married Dutch illustrator Cees Bantzinger. In 1956, she finished in second place in the Nationaal Songfestival 1956 with the song "De vogels van Holland", written by Annie M.G. Schmidt and composed by Cor Lemaire. This gave her the right, with Corry Brokken, to represent the Netherlands in the first edition of the Eurovision Song Contest. Being the first performer of the evening, Paerl wrote history as the first singer ever to perform in the Eurovision Song Contest. At the time the contest was only broadcast via radio, and only the winning song was announced.

In 1985, Paerl's husband revealed that he had been a member of the NSB for a short period of time in the beginning of World War II, after journalist Adriaan Venema had confronted him with letters he had sent to the Department of Public Information and the Arts at the time. One week later, Bantzinger committed suicide by drowning. Paerl herself died on 22 August 2013 in Amstelveen, at the age of 92.

Discography

EPs 
 Jetty Paerl – 1957
 Jetty Paerl 2 – 1957

Albums 
 Jetje van Radio Oranje – 1970 (LP), 1995 (CD)

Trivia 
 Paerl appears in episode 18 of the British documentary series The World at War (1973–74).

References

External links

1921 births
2013 deaths
Dutch women singers
Musicians from Amsterdam
Jewish Dutch musicians
Dutch resistance members
Eurovision Song Contest entrants for the Netherlands
Eurovision Song Contest entrants of 1956
Nationaal Songfestival contestants
20th-century Dutch women
Royal Netherlands Army personnel of World War II